Dog Island is a small island, situated on the Gambia River in the Republic of the Gambia about 13 kilometres from the mouth of the river to the Atlantic Ocean. The area of the island is less than 3.5 hectares. During low tide the island is connected to the mainland, but during high tide it is separated by about 150 metres from the headland of Dog Island Point on the north bank of the river.  The island is named after the sound made by the resident baboons, which from a distance sounds like dogs barking.

History 

The first European known to land on the island was Alvise Cadamosto, a Venetian captain in the service of the Portuguese Prince Henry the Navigator in 1456, who named the island Ilha de Santo André, on account of a deceased crew member named "André" who they buried there. (In 1651, colonists from the Duchy of Courland  built a fort a little upriver on what is now called Kunta Kinteh Island and was then called "St. Andrews island"; evidently, Cadamosto's name got transferred from Dog island to Kunta Kinteh island sometime in the interim.)

In 1661, the English captain Robert Holmes arrived on behalf of the Royal African Company to establish an English presence in the Gambia river (and, less explicitly, to eject the Courlanders from the area).  Holmes built the first English installation, a small fort on Dog island, which he named Charles Island, after King Charles I of England.  It was abandoned in 1816, with the erection of another fort on St. Mary's Island (now Banjul island).  Dog Island served as a quarry for the construction of Banjul, and has remained uninhabited since.

Currently, tourists are occasionally ferried from Banjul to Dog Island to observe the dolphins swimming in the Gambia River estuary.

References 

History of the Gambia
1661 establishments in the British Empire
Gambia River
River islands of the Gambia
Former English colonies